Jean-Claude Klein (22 June 1944 – 1 December 2014) was a French rower who competed in the 1960 Summer Olympics.  There, he won a silver medal in the four-oared shell with coxswain. He was Jewish, and was born in Créteil. In 1960 he was the coxswain of the French boat which won the silver medal in the coxed fours event.

References

External links
 

1944 births
2014 deaths
French male rowers
Coxswains (rowing)
Olympic rowers of France
Rowers at the 1960 Summer Olympics
Olympic silver medalists for France
Olympic medalists in rowing
20th-century French Jews
Jewish sportspeople
Medalists at the 1960 Summer Olympics
20th-century French people